Susan Janet Crockford (born 1954) is a Canadian contract scientist who runs a small business identifying bones and other items in scat of wildlife. She is a blogger who writes about zoology and climate science, specializing in Holocene mammals.  From 2004 to 2019 she was an adjunct professor in Anthropology at the University of Victoria. She is known for her blog posts on polar bear biology, which are unsupported by the scientific literature and oppose the scientific consensus that polar bears are threatened by ongoing climate change.

Early life and education 
Crockford first gained her interest in the Arctic in elementary school, when she read about Inuit life and Arctic fauna.  Her scientific interest in the Arctic was stoked when she received her first Alaskan Malamute at age eleven.

Crockford received her Bachelor of Science in Zoology at the University of British Columbia in 1976 and her doctorate in Interdisciplinary Studies from the University of Victoria in 2004.  She chose to focus on speciation in mammals, with a focus on thyroid function. Her theories about the role of thyroid function on evolution have not been widely accepted. Lars Olof Bjorn noted several questionable issues about Crockford's theories including the following: "Recently, an article (Crockford 2009) was published in Integrative and Comparative Biology that requires comment. Below in italics are the relevant passages from the article, each followed by my comment. ‘‘Iodine is known to be crucial for life in many uni- cellular organisms (including evolutionarily ancient cyanobacteria) ...’’ Comment: No reference is given and it is questionable whether iodine is an essential element for cyanobacteria."

Career

Business 
In 1988, Crockford, along with colleagues Rebecca Wigen and Gay Frederick, founded the contracting company Pacific Identifications Inc. in Victoria.  The company specializes in offering bone and shell analysis of skeletal elements of fish, mammals and birds from western North America and maintains a prominent library of reference animal remains. Since the start of her career, she has worked primarily through paid contracts for specific work on a variety of topics.

Books 
In 2006, she published the book Rhythms of Life: Thyroid Hormone and the Origin of Species, which asserted that "thyroid rhythms" are the sole cause of "virtually all significant evolutionarily significant differences in life history traits."  She hypothesized that the thyroid is the key to controlling species-specific growth and for maintaining homeostatic conditions for individuals. Reviewing the book for The University of Chicago Press, Samantha J. Richardson noted that despite offering some "refreshing new" ideas, "no evidence is presented for the existence of these 'thyroid hormones,' " that "there are errors in the descriptions of molecular biology, biochemistry, and endocrinology," that some statements are "simply wrong" and "the references are not always accurate."

Dogs 
Crockford has studied the evolutionary history of dogs, especially in regards to their domestication and speciation.  In 2007, she was called upon as the scientific consultant for the PBS documentary, Dogs that Changed the World, focused upon the domestication of dogs.  In the two-part documentary, she was called upon multiple times to give insight into the process of domestication and the emergence of dogs as a separate species from wolves. She has also written several peer-reviewed papers on this topic.

Polar bears 
 Although Crockford has not published peer-reviewed research on polar bears, she has challenged findings of widely recognized polar bear scientists, notably Steven Amstrup and Ian Stirling, stating that a 2015 paper by these researchers and others deliberately misrepresented data about polar bear population collapse. Two of the researchers responded to her claims with a rebuttal on the website Climate Feedback, to which she responded in her blog.

Controversy 
Crockford is a signatory of the International Conference on Climate Change's 2008 Manhattan Declaration, which states that "Carbon dioxide and other 'greenhouse gas' emissions from human activity...appear to have only a very small impact on global climate," and "Global cooling has presented serious problems for human society and the environment throughout history while global warming has generally been highly beneficial." Between at least 2011 and 2013, she received payment from The Heartland Institute, in the form of $750 per month, which Crockford states was to provide summaries of published papers that might not have been covered by the Intergovernmental Panel on Climate Change's Fifth Assessment Report.  This payment has been construed as an undisclosed conflict of interest, by blogs such as Desmog Blog.  Her response to such claims was a disclosure of the job description, how much she was paid, and the duration of the contract.

According to a 2018 study by Netherlands ecology professor Jeffrey Harvey and others, while Crockford has neither conducted any original research nor published any articles in the peer-reviewed literature on the effects of sea ice on the population dynamics of polar bears, her blog, Polar Bear Science, was a primary source used by websites that either deny or are skeptical of climate change, with over 80 percent citing it as their primary source of information on polar bears.

Crockford's unpaid adjunct professor position at the University of Victoria, which she held for 15 years, was not renewed when she came up for another term in May 2019. The University declined to give a reason.

References

External links 
 Polar Bear Science
 Pacific Identifications

Living people
Academic staff of the University of Victoria
University of Victoria alumni
University of British Columbia Faculty of Science alumni
21st-century Canadian women scientists
Canadian zoologists
Place of birth missing (living people)
Heartland Institute
1954 births
Women zoologists